"Highway to Hell" is a song by Australian rock band AC/DC. It is the opening track of their 1979 album Highway to Hell. It was initially released as a single in 1979.

The song was written by Angus Young, Malcolm Young and Bon Scott, with Angus Young credited for writing the guitar riff which became an instant classic. AC/DC had made several studio albums before and were constantly promoting them via a grueling tour schedule, referred to by Angus Young as being on a highway to Hell, hence the name.

Background 
The song is in the key of A Major. The title and lyrics reflect the arduous nature of touring constantly and life on the road. The highway that inspired the title, Canning Highway, connects the Perth Kwinana freeway to its port Fremantle and was home to many of Bon Scott's favourite pubs and hotels, including the Raffles Hotel.

"There were hundreds of riffs going down every day," recalled Malcolm Young. "But this one, we thought, 'That's good.' It just stuck out like a dog's balls."

Cash Box called it a "bone crunching, gut-wrenching exercise in primal guitar rock" with "simple yet effective riffing" and "ballsy vocals."  Record World said that "Growling vocals join a raunchy guitar assualt for simple, high voltage, rock'n'roll abandon."

The single spent 45 weeks on the German Singles Chart, peaked at #30 in its 19th week on the chart. Bon Scott was found dead in the back of a friend's car, just over six months after the song was released.

Production 
"Highway to Hell" was produced by Mutt Lange as part of the album by the same name, and his work is regarded as a significant factor in delivering one of the classic AC/DC albums, the emergence of the double-guitar sound, which was later perfected on Back in Black, and improved backing vocals with Malcolm Young, joined by Cliff Williams for the first time.

Legacy 
"Highway to Hell" won the 'Most Played Australian Work Overseas' category at the 2009 APRA Awards. In 2013, an internet campaign attempted to get it to number one in the UK Christmas singles chart.

In January 2018, as part of Triple M's "Ozzest 100", the 'most Australian' songs of all time, "Highway to Hell" was ranked number 40.

In 2020, The Guardian ranked the song number seven on their list of the 40 greatest AC/DC songs, and in 2021, Kerrang ranked the song number five on their list of the 20 greatest AC/DC songs.

List of accolades 
Ranked No. 258 on Rolling Stone magazine's list of the 500 Greatest Songs of All Time.<ref>500 Greatest Songs of All Time Highway to Hell The 500 Greatest Songs of All Time]</ref>
Ranked No. 152 on the 500 Greatest Classic Rock Songs compiled by 94.5 XKR.
Ranked No. 23 on The Top 500 Heavy Metal Songs of All Time, a book by Martin Popoff.

The master ringtone was certified Gold by the RIAA in June 2007 for sales in excess of 500,000.

 Personnel 
Bon Scott – lead vocals
Angus Young – lead guitar
Malcolm Young – rhythm guitar, backing vocals
Cliff Williams – bass guitar, backing vocals
Phil Rudd – drums

Charts

 Certifications 

 Live recordings 

"Highway to Hell" has been performed multiple times in live concert. Including:Live: This was also released as a single. A video for the single was also released, containing a montage of footage from the Live at Donington home video.Let There Be Rock: The MovieLive at River Plate''

References 

1979 songs
1979 singles
1992 singles
AC/DC songs
Albert Productions singles
APRA Award winners
Atco Records singles
Atlantic Records singles
Epic Records singles
Marilyn Manson (band) songs
Song recordings produced by Robert John "Mutt" Lange
Songs written by Angus Young
Songs written by Bon Scott
Songs written by Malcolm Young